Medan Sunggal is one of the 21 administrative districts in the city of Medan, North Sumatra, Indonesia. It is home to two shopping malls: Manhattan Times Square (not Manhattan Times Square in New York, although the name is inspired by the place), and Ring Road City Walks.

The district of Medan Sunggal is bordered by:

 Deli Serdang Regency, to the west
 Medan Baru, to the east
 Medan Selayang, to the south
 Medan Helvetia towards the north

It covers an area of 13.34 sq.km and at the 2010 Census it had a population of 112,744.

References 

Districts of Medan